The Kennaway Baronetcy of Hyderabad in the East Indies, is a title in the Baronetage of Great Britain. It was created on 25 February 1791 for John Kennaway (1758–1836), British Resident at the Court of Nizam Ali Khan, Asaf Jah II, Nizam of Hyderabad, in recognition of his part in the negotiation of the 1790 alliance between the Nizam and the East India Company against Tipoo Sultan. The second Baronet was High Sheriff of Devon in 1866. The third Baronet was a Conservative politician.

The Kennaway family originated in Fife, Scotland. In 1713 the young William I Kennaway moved from Scotland to Exeter in Devon to continue his trade as a sergemaker and clothier. His son William II Kennaway joined the business which between the years 1750 and 1790 expanded into a major force in the Devonshire woollen trade, which however soon thereafter collapsed due to the Napoleonic Wars. William III Kennaway (grandson of William I) started anew in the wine trade, whilst his brothers sought their fortunes in the East Indies: John Kennaway, later the 1st Baronet and Richard Kennaway (later of Fort House, Sidmouth, Devon, built in 1805, now called "Kennaway House") who also acquired a fortune working for the Board of Trade in Bengal.

The seat of the Kennaway Baronets since 1794 has been Escot House in the parish of Talaton, near Ottery St Mary, Devon. The Kennaway family motto is Ascendam ("I will rise").

Kennaway baronets of Hyderabad (1791)
Sir John Kennaway, 1st Baronet (1758–1836)
Sir John Kennaway, 2nd Baronet (1797–1873)
Sir John Henry Kennaway, 3rd Baronet (1837–1919)
Sir John Kennaway, 4th Baronet (1879–1956)
Sir John Lawrence Kennaway, 5th Baronet (1933–2017)
Sir John-Michael Kennaway, 6th Baronet (born 1962)

Further reading
The House of Kennaway Through Ten Successive Reigns: 1743-1963, published by Kennaway & Co (Wine Merchants), Exeter, 1963.
Kennaway & Co (Wine Merchants), minutes, agenda books, share records, directors' reports, financial records, sales and stock records, correspondence, etc., 1880-20th cent, Devon Archives and Local Studies Service (South West Heritage Trust, 75/17 
Kennaway & Co (Wine Merchants), orders and family portraits,  	1682–1875, Devon Archives and Local Studies Service (South West Heritage Trust), 6322 
 Debrett's Baronetage of England (1839) p72 Google Books
 Debrett's Illustrated Baronetage
 The Official Roll of the Baronets
 Kidd, Charles, Williamson, David (editors). Debrett's Peerage and Baronetage (1990 edition). New York: St Martin's Press, 1990.

References

External links

Kennaway
1791 establishments in Great Britain